Piqqem was an online stock selection service. It is located in Los Altos, California

Method 
It uses a method of selection based on the Wisdom of Crowds. It launched in the fall of 2008 with funding from early-stage Apple investor Mike Markkula (the first investor in Apple) and Tellme Networks founder Mike McCue. Piqqem encourages users to make predictions on stock prices with simple graphic icons or using online graphing charts. Piqqem then uses a proprietary algorithm to aggregate the expressed sentiments in graphics and symbolic form and compile those aggregate sentiments to provide predictions on share price movement based on the collective "crowd opinion."

Critics 
Critics of Piqqem's approach assert that the stock market already reflects the wisdom of crowds in its pricing methodology. Piqqem ended its Twitter operations 19 July 2010.

References

External links
Piqqem Homepage
Piqqem Blog

Companies based in Santa Clara County, California
Financial services companies established in 2008
Investment management companies of the United States
Prediction markets